Tibor Pleiß (alternative spelling Pleiss; born 2 November 1989) is a German professional basketball player for Anadolu Efes of the Turkish Super League and the EuroLeague. Standing , he plays the center position. He is also a member of the German national team.

Professional career

Europe
Pleiß joined RheinEnergie Köln (a year later they changed their name to Köln 99ers) of the German Bundesliga as a 17-year-old in 2006. He played with the club for three years, playing in the 2008 EuroCup. After the season ended, he joined the Brose Baskets where he played for three years.

On 24 June 2012, Pleiß left Germany and signed a four-year contract with the Spanish club Saski Baskonia, one of the top teams of the Liga ACB. In the 2013–14 season, he averaged 12.4 points on 58.3 percent shooting and 6.0 rebounds in 21.8 minutes per game. He left Baskonia after two years.

On 11 August 2014, he signed a two-year contract with the Spanish club FC Barcelona. In the 2014–15 ACB season, he averaged 5.7 points and 3.8 rebounds in 13.3 minutes per game while shooting 62.3 percent from the floor. In July 2015, he broke the contract with Barcelona, in order to sign in the NBA.

NBA
Pleiß declared for the 2010 NBA draft. He was drafted by the New Jersey Nets, who traded his rights to the Atlanta Hawks. The Hawks then sold his rights to the Oklahoma City Thunder. In February 2015, his draft rights were traded to the Utah Jazz as part of a three-team trade.

On 14 July 2015, Pleiß signed a multi-year deal with the Utah Jazz. He made his NBA debut on 30 October in a 99–71 win over the Philadelphia 76ers, recording two points and one rebound in two minutes. On 2 January 2016, in a 92–87 overtime win over the Memphis Grizzlies, Pleiß set career-highs with six points, six rebounds and 17 minutes. During his rookie season, he received multiple assignments to the Idaho Stampede, Utah's D-League affiliate.

On 26 August 2016, Pleiß was traded, along with two 2017 second-round draft picks and cash considerations, to the Philadelphia 76ers in exchange for Kendall Marshall. Five days later, he was waived by the 76ers.

Return to Europe
On 12 September 2016, Pleiß signed with Turkish club Galatasaray for the 2016–17 season.

On July 28, 2017, Pleiß signed a two-year deal with the Spanish club Valencia Basket.

On August 1, 2018, he signed a two (1+1) year contract with the Turkish club Anadolu Efes S.K.. On July 12, 2020, Pleiß officially renewed his contract with Efes for another three (2+1) seasons.

German national team
Pleiß was a member of the junior national teams of Germany. He played for the German junior national teams at the 2007 FIBA Europe Under-18 Championship and at both the 2008 FIBA Europe Under-20 Championship Division B and the 2009 FIBA Europe Under-20 Championship.

Pleiß is also a member of the senior men's German national basketball team. He first played for the senior team at EuroBasket 2009, and saw action in three games. He was also in the German team that participated in the 2010 FIBA World Championship in Turkey, where he was the starting center for Germany. He also played at the EuroBasket 2011 and the EuroBasket 2013.

Career statistics

EuroLeague

|-
| style="text-align:left;"| 2010–11
| style="text-align:left;" rowspan=2| Brose Baskets
| 10 || 10 || 19.1 || .413 || .444 || .789 || 6.3 || .9 || .1 || 1.5 || 6.7 || 8.6
|-
| style="text-align:left;"| 2011–12
| 10 || 4 || 18.5 || .500 || .000 || .682 || 5.4 || .4 || .0 || .8 || 6.5 || 8.1
|-
| style="text-align:left;"| 2012–13
| style="text-align:left;" rowspan=2| Baskonia
| 25 || 4 || 14.2 || .607 || .333 || .846 || 3.9 || .2 || .2 || .6 || 5.0 || 6.1
|-
| style="text-align:left;"| 2013–14
| 24 || 21 || 21.0 || .557 || .333 || .863 || 5.4 || .5 || .5 || 1.0 || 12.0 || 13.7
|-
| style="text-align:left;"| 2014–15
| style="text-align:left;"| Barcelona
| 25 || 1 || 13.1 || .584 || .500 || .848 || 3.9 || .2 || .2 || .6 || 5.3 || 6.9
|-
| style="text-align:left;"| 2016–17
| style="text-align:left;"| Galatasaray
| 28 || 20 || 17.1 || .567 || .400 || .765 || 4.6 || .5 || .2 || 1.2 || 7.7 || 10.4
|-
| style="text-align:left;"| 2017–18
| style="text-align:left;"| Valencia
| 29 || 14 || 19.3 || .565 || .500 || .797 || 5.2 || .6 || .4 || 1.1 || 10.1 || 12.4
|-
| style="text-align:left;"| 2018–19
| style="text-align:left;"| Efes Pilsen
| 37 || 5 || 14.2 || .623 || .333 || .878 || 3.7 || .4 || .4 || .5 || 8.1 || 9.6
|- class="sortbottom"
| style="text-align:left;"| Career
| style="text-align:left;"|
| 188 || 79 || 16.6 || .568 || .383 || .818 || 4.6 || .4 || .3 || .9 || 7.9 || 9.7

NBA

Regular season

Source

|-
| style="text-align:left;"| 2015–16
| style="text-align:left;"| Utah
| 12 || 0 || 6.8 || .440 || .000 || 1.000 || 1.3 || .2 || .1 || .2 || 2.0

References

External links

 Tibor Pleiß at acb.com 
 Tibor Pleiß at euroleague.net
 Tibor Pleiß at fiba.com
 

1989 births
Living people
2010 FIBA World Championship players
Anadolu Efes S.K. players
Brose Bamberg players
Centers (basketball)
FC Barcelona Bàsquet players
Galatasaray S.K. (men's basketball) players
German expatriate basketball people in Spain
German expatriate basketball people in Turkey
German expatriate basketball people in the United States
German men's basketball players
Idaho Stampede players
Köln 99ers players
Liga ACB players
National Basketball Association players from Germany
New Jersey Nets draft picks
People from Bergisch Gladbach
Sportspeople from Cologne (region)
Saski Baskonia players
Utah Jazz players
Valencia Basket players